Nicolas Escudé was the defending champion and won in the final 3–6, 7–6(9–7), 6–4 against Tim Henman.

Seeds
A champion seed is indicated in bold text while text in italics indicates the round in which that seed was eliminated.

  Juan Carlos Ferrero (first round)
  Yevgeny Kafelnikov (second round)
  Marat Safin (second round)
  Sébastien Grosjean (semifinals)
  Thomas Johansson (second round)
  Tim Henman (final)
  Roger Federer (quarterfinals)
  Goran Ivanišević (first round)

Draw

External links
 2002 ABN AMRO World Tennis Tournament Singles draw

2002 ABN AMRO World Tennis Tournament
Singles